Matheus Gabriel De Liz Corrêa (born 22 August 1999) is a Brazilian racewalking athlete. He qualified to represent Brazil at the 2020 Summer Olympics in Tokyo 2021, competing in men's 20 kilometres walk.

References

External links
 

 

1999 births
Living people
Brazilian male racewalkers
Athletes (track and field) at the 2020 Summer Olympics
Olympic athletes of Brazil
People from Blumenau
Sportspeople from Santa Catarina (state)
21st-century Brazilian people